Phantoms are a Los Angeles-based electronic dance music duo. The group consists of former teenage actors Kyle Kaplan and Vinnie Pergola.

Career 
Their eponymous debut album was released in March 2017. Their song "Just a Feeling", which was downloaded over 5,000 times, charted on the Dance/Mix Show Airplay chart at number 40. The album's first and second singles "Pulling Me In" and "Been Here Before" were released.

Before Phantoms was formed, Kaplan and Pergola listened to classic rock bands such as Led Zeppelin and Pink Floyd. They also had garage band. In 2007, the duo learnt and began producing electronic music. In 2016, they collaborated with Skylar Astin to release the single "Call My Name". 

In 2017, they collaborated with Giorgio Moroder to release the song "Champagne, Secrets, & Chanel".

In October 2018, Phantoms collaborated with Vanessa Hudgens to release the single "Lay with Me", which came out on October 3, 2018.

On February 22, 2019, Phantoms released the single "Are You Up" featuring Shaylen.

Discography

Singles

References

Musical groups from Los Angeles
American electronic dance music groups